Grendel Inc., founded by George Kellgren, was a Florida firearms company which produced polymer framed semi-automatic pistols from 1987 to 1994. Zytel was used for grips, magazines, and furniture while slides, barrels, slide rails, and other high-pressure parts were manufactured using LaSalle Stressproof steel.

Products

Grendel P10 - introduced in 1988, the P10 is a .380 double action only with no levers with rudimentary sights and had a large trigger guard. It also had no detachable magazine and was loaded by locking the slide back and feeding ten rounds through the open chamber into the spring-loaded grip itself, usually with a stripper clip.

Grendel P12 - produced from 1991 until 1994, the P12 is a P10 with an 11-round detachable box magazine. It was Grendel's last .380.

Grendel P30 - a single-action, fluted barrel .22 WMR magnum blowback pistol that used a 30-round box magazine. The  five inch barrel model gave an overall length of 8.5 inches.

 Grendel P30M - Introduced in 1990 the P30MA is a carbine version of the Grendel P30 and has a built-in muzzle brake.

Grendel R31 - another .22 WMR magnum carbine.

Notes

See also
 Kel-Tec
 Kel-Tec PMR-30 a modern rendition of the P30

Defunct firearms manufacturers
Firearm manufacturers of the United States
Companies based in Miami
1987 establishments in Florida
Manufacturing companies established in 1987
1994 disestablishments in Florida
Manufacturing companies disestablished in 1994
Defunct manufacturing companies based in Florida